Junior Livramento (born 12 December 1987) is a Dutch former professional footballer who played as a left-back or midfielder.

Career
Livramento's first professional appearance was as a 17-year-old in an Eerste Divisie match with Dordrecht. In 2006, he moved to Willem II to play in the reserve squad. In the summer of 2009 he got the chance to prove himself with the first team, because of the bad financial situation of the club. On 1 August 2009 he made his debut for Willem II, replacing Saïd Boutahar against Vitesse.

References

1987 births
Living people
Footballers from Rotterdam
Dutch sportspeople of Cape Verdean descent
Dutch footballers
Eredivisie players
Eerste Divisie players
FC Dordrecht players
Willem II (football club) players
RBC Roosendaal players
AGOVV Apeldoorn players
Association football defenders
Association football midfielders